This is a list of the Sites of Special Scientific Interest (SSSIs) in the Merthyr Tydfil Area of Search (AoS).

Sites
 Baltic and Tyler-bont Quarries
 Brecon Beacons
 Cwm Glo a Glyndyrys
 Cwm Taf Fechan Woodlands
 Daren Fach
 Nant Glais Caves

References

Merthyr Tydfil